Heyman Cheatamee is a Thai film director. His debut film was the horror-comedy Body Jumper in 2001.

Filmography 
Body Jumper (Pop Weed Sayong) (2001)
Love to Death (Fa Kab Heo) (2003)
Sexphone & The Lonely Wave (Khluen Ngao Sao Khang Ban) (2003) – co-directed with Chalermpol Bunnag
Xtreme Limit (Pan X Dek Sood Kua) (2004)
The Memory (Ruk Jung) (2006)
Rakna 24 Hours (Rakna 24 Chuamohng) (2007)

References

Heyman Cheatamee
Year of birth missing (living people)
Living people
Place of birth missing (living people)
Heyman Cheatamee